Waskerley railway station, also known as Waskerley Park, served the village of Waskerley, County Durham, England from 1845 to 1859 on the Stanhope and Tyne Railway.

History 
The station opened on 1 September 1845 by the Stockton and Darlington Railway. It was situated on Waskerley Way on the south side of an unnamed loop road running between railway cottages and a farm in Waskerley. The station was short lived; closing 14 years after opening on 4 July 1859, although unadvertised express occasionally ran between 1880 and 1921. The station and line were still open to goods traffic, primarily lime and stone, but this was discontinued due to competition of road traffic and the station was closed to goods traffic on 2 August 1965.

References 

Disused railway stations in County Durham
Former North Eastern Railway (UK) stations
Railway stations in Great Britain opened in 1845
Railway stations in Great Britain closed in 1859
1845 establishments in England
1965 disestablishments in England